Electric Würms are an American band.  The band is a collaboration between The Flaming Lips members Steven Drozd, Wayne Coyne and Nashville, TN band Linear Downfall.  Their album, Muzik Die Schwer Zu Twerk, was released on August 18, 2014. The first single from the album is a cover version of "Heart Of The Sunrise", a 1971 song by progressive rock band Yes.

Discography
 Musik Die Schwer Zu Twerk (2014)

References

Warner Records artists
The Flaming Lips
2015 establishments in the United States
American supergroups
Musical groups established in 2015
American psychedelic rock music groups
American progressive rock groups